Coopernail sign is a medical sign that denotes fracture of pelvis.

References

Medical signs